Aljaž Ploj (born 30 August 1998) is a Slovenian footballer who plays for Aluminij as a defender.

Club career
Ploj made his Slovenian PrvaLiga debut for Aluminij on 7 March 2018 in a game against Olimpija Ljubljana.

References

External links
 
 Aljaž Ploj at NZS 

1998 births
Living people
Slovenian footballers
Slovenia under-21 international footballers
Association football defenders
NK Aluminij players
Slovenian PrvaLiga players